Norman Van Aken is an American chef and author.
Charlie Trotter named Van Aken the "Walt Whitman of American cuisine."

Published works
Feast of Sunlight 1988
The Exotic Fruit Book 1995
Norman's New World Cuisine 1997
New World Kitchen 2003
My Key West Kitchen 2012, (with Justin Van Aken)
No Experience Necessary: The Culinary Odyssey of Chef Norman Van Aken, 2013
My Florida Kitchen, 2017

Awards and honors
In 2006, Van Aken was honored as one of the "Founders of New American Cuisine," alongside Alice Waters, Paul Prudhomme, and Mark Miller at Spain's International Summit of Gastronomy.

References

Living people
American chefs
American food writers
Year of birth missing (living people)
James Beard Foundation Award winners